Angela of Oloron (French: Angela d’Oloron: 11th-century) was a French noblewoman, Lady of Oloron and Viscountess of Béarn by marriage to Centule IV, Viscount of Béarn.

Life 
Angela was most likely the daughter of the Viscount Aner Loup and his spouse of an unknown name.
Her brother was likely Viscount Loup Aner, a son of her possible father by a concubine.
She married Centule IV, Viscount of Béarn, a son of Gaston II, Viscount of Béarn.

She had three children with her husband:
Gaston III, Viscount of Béarn, father of Centule V, Viscount of Béarn
Raymond 
Aureol, lord of Baudreix

See also 
Oloron-Sainte-Marie
Viscounts of Béarn

Sources 

11th-century French women
Year of birth unknown